Franz Czernicky (16 September 1902 – 16 June 1973) was an Austrian footballer. He played in one match for the Austria national football team in 1927.

References

External links
 

1902 births
1973 deaths
Austrian footballers
Austria international footballers
Place of birth missing
Association football defenders
SK Slavia Prague players
SC Fives players
Austrian expatriate footballers
Expatriate footballers in Czechoslovakia
Expatriate footballers in France
Austrian football managers
SK Sturm Graz managers